Todd Ducharme is a Canadian judge. In 2004, he was the first Métis to be appointed to the  Ontario Superior Court of Justice.

Background

He received a Bachelor of Arts degree from McGill University, a Master of Arts in Political Science degree from Yale University, a Bachelor of Law degree in 1986 from the University of Toronto and a Master of Laws degree in 1991 from Yale Law School.

References 
 

Year of birth missing (living people)
Living people
Judges in Ontario
McGill University alumni
Yale Law School alumni
University of Toronto alumni
Canadian Métis people